Samuel Christian (March 20, 1939 – March 6, 2016) also known as Richard Carter, Sam 'Beyah' Christian, and Suleiman Bey, was the founder of the Philadelphia Black Mafia.

Christian changed his name upon joining the Nation of Islam and eventually became captain in their paramilitary unit, the Fruit of Islam.

FBI most wanted 
Christian was the 321st person to be added to the FBI's Ten Most Wanted list as a suspect in the 1972 murder of Tyrone "Fat Ty" Palmer, who was shot in the face at Club Harlem, and as a suspect in the 1973 murder of Major Coxson and shooting of several others at Coxson's residence. Because there were no witnesses willing to testify against him, he was not convicted of either murder.

References

External links
requiem for a gangster

1939 births
2016 deaths
African-American gangsters
American gangsters
Black Mafia
FBI Ten Most Wanted Fugitives
Fugitives
Members of the Nation of Islam
Gangsters from Philadelphia
20th-century African-American people
21st-century African-American people